The Lucaninae comprise the largest subfamily of the stag beetles (Lucanidae).

Characteristics include partial to complete division of the eyes by a canthus, geniculate antennae, and distinctly separated coxae. The body is typically elongated and slightly flattened.

Genera

Some notable species are also listed: 

 Aegognathus
 Aegus
 Agnus
 Allotopus
 Amneidus
 Andinolucanus
 Aphanognathus
 Apterocyclus
 Apterodorcus Arrow, 1943
 Auxicerus
 Bartolozziolucanus
 Beneshius
 Bomansius
 Brasilucanus
 Cacostomus
 C. squamosus
 Calcodes
 Cantharolethrus
 C. luxeri
 Capreolucanus
 Cardanus
 Casignetus
 Charagmophorus
 Chewlucanus
 Chiasognathus
 Cladophyllus
 Cladognathus
 Colophon
 Cyclommatus
 C. scutellaris
 Dendezia
 Diasomoides
 Dinonigidius
 Dorculus
 Dorcus
 Dynodorcus
 Eligmodontus
 Epipedesthus
 Eulepidius
 Figulus
 Ganelius
 Geodorcus
 Gnaphaloryx
 Gonometopus
 Hemisodorcus
 Heterochthes
 Hexarthrius
 Homoderus
 Hoplogonus
 Incadorcus
 Leptinopterus
 Lissapterus
 Lissotes
 L. latidens – "Wielangta stag beetle", "broad-toothed stag beetle"
 Lucanus
 Macrocrates
 Macrodorcas
 Mesotopus
 Metadorcinus
 Metadorcus
 Metallactulus
 Microlucanus
 Neolucanus
 N. castanopterus
 Nigidionus
 Nigidius
 Noseolucanus
 Novonigidius
 Odontolabis
 Onorelucanus
 Oonotus
 Paralissotes
 P. reticulatus
 Penichrolucanus
 Platyceroides
 Platyceropsis
 Platycerus
 Platyfigulus
 Prismognathus
 Prosopocoilus
 Pseudodorcus
 Pseudorhaetus
 Pycnosiphorus
 Rhaetulus
 R. crenatus
 Rhaetus
 Ryssonotus
 Safrina
 Sclerostomus
 Scortizus
 Serrognathus
 Sphaenognathus
 Telodorcus
 Tetrarthrius
 Velutinodorcus
 Vinsonella
 Weinreichius
 Xiphodontus
 Yumikoi

References 

 Brett C. Ratcliffe, "Lucanidae", in Ross H. Arnett, Jr. and Michael C. Thomas, American Beetles (CRC Press, 2002), p. 7
 UNL museum checklist of New World Lucanidae
 G. Cassis, W.W.K. Houston, T.A. Weir & B.P. Moore (1992). Updated by A.A. Calder (2002). Coleoptera: Scarabaeoida. Australian Faunal Directory. Australian Biological Resources Study, Canberra. Viewed 22 November 2007.